Hull Creek is a  tributary of the tidal portion of the Potomac River in Northumberland County in Virginia's Northern Neck.

See also
List of Virginia rivers

References

Rivers of Northumberland County, Virginia
Rivers of Virginia
Tributaries of the Potomac River